Aljaž Bedene was the defending champion, and returned to defend his title but lost to Viktor Troicki in the quarterfinals.

Viktor Troicki won the title by defeating Albert Ramos 7–5, 4–6, 7–5 in the final.

Seeds

Draw

Finals

Top half

Bottom half

References
 Main Draw
 Qualifying Draw

Banja Luka Challenger - Singles
2014 Singles
2014 in Bosnia and Herzegovina